Robert Leo Hackett (January 31, 1915 – June 7, 1976) was an American jazz musician who played trumpet, cornet, and guitar with the bands of Glenn Miller and Benny Goodman in the late 1930s and early 1940s. Hackett was a featured soloist on some of the Jackie Gleason mood music albums during the 1950s.

Biography
Bobby Hackett was born in Providence, Rhode Island, United States. He made his name as a follower of cornet player Bix Beiderbecke. Benny Goodman hired the talented 23 year old to recreate Bix's "I'm Coming Virginia" solo at his (Goodman's) 1938 Carnegie Hall concert. In the late 1930s, Hackett played lead trumpet in the Vic Schoen Orchestra which backed the Andrews Sisters. Hackett can be heard on the soundtrack to the 1940 Fred Astaire movie, Second Chorus.

In 1939, the talent agency MCA asked Bobby Hackett to form a big band with its backing. When the band failed, he was in substantial debt to MCA after it folded. He joined the bands of Horace Heidt and then Glenn Miller to pay this debt. To make matters worse, his lip was in bad shape after dental surgery, making it difficult for him to play the trumpet or cornet. Glenn Miller offered him a job as a guitarist. "When I joined the band and I was making good money at last, [...] [jazz critics] accused me of selling out. Hell I wasn't selling out, I was selling in! It's funny, isn't it, how you go right into the wastebasket with some critics the minute you become successful."

Despite lip problems, Hackett could play occasional short solos, and he can be heard playing with the Glenn Miller Orchestra on "A String of Pearls". Hackett referred to this solo as 'just a little exercise'. A dream come true for Hackett was his inclusion in Louis Armstrong's 1947 Town Hall Jazz Concert. In 1954, he appeared as a regular on the ABC variety show The Martha Wright Show, also known as The Packard Showroom.

His profile increased after he was hired by Jackie Gleason as a cornet soloist, for seven of Gleason's mood music albums. Beginning in 1952, he appeared on Gleason's first Capitol Records album, Music for Lovers Only. The record — as well as all of Gleason's next 10 albums — went gold. He appeared on six more of Gleason's albums. This association led directly to his signing with Capitol Records and performing trumpet and flugelhorn solos on several popular albums, including the best selling concept albums of Frank Sinatra.

Mosaic Records released The Complete Capitol Bobby Hackett Solo Sessions on a five-CD limited edition set. Most of the tracks were from Gleason's mood music albums. According to the liner notes, Hackett received compensation of between $30 to $40 thousand for six albums for Gleason.

In 1965, he toured with the singer Tony Bennett. In 1966 and 1967, he accompanied Bennett on two European tours. In the early 1970s, he performed separately with Dizzy Gillespie and Teresa Brewer.

In 2012, Hackett was selected to be inducted into the Rhode Island Music Hall of Fame.

Personal life
Bobby Hackett married Edna Lillian Lee Hackett (d. 2000) in 1937. The Hacketts lived primarily in New York City and spent summers on Cape Cod, Massachusetts. They had a daughter, Barbara (d. 2003); and a son, Ernie, who became a professional drummer.

Hackett was a Freemason and was active with St. Cecile Lodge #568, a lodge specifically for musicians and artists.

Hackett died in 1976 of a heart attack at the age of 61.

Discography

As leader
 Soft Lights and Bobby Hackett (Capitol, 1954)
 In a Mellow Mood (Capitol, 1955)
 Coast Concert (Capitol, 1956)
 Gotham Jazz Scene (Capitol, 1957)
 Rendezvous (Capitol, 1957)
 Bobby Hackett At The Embers (Capitol, 1958)
 Don't Take Your Love from Me (Capitol, 1958)
 Jazz Ultimate with Jack Teagarden (Capitol, 1958)
 The Bobby Hackett Quartet (Capitol, 1959)
 Blues with a Kick (Capitol, 1959)
 Hawaii Swings (Capitol, 1960)
 Dream Awhile (Columbia, 1960)
 The Most Beautiful Horn in the World (Columbia, 1962)
 Night Love (Columbia, 1962)
 Bobby Hackett Plays Henry Mancini (Epic, 1962)
 Plays the Music of Bert Kaempfert (Epic, 1964)
 Hello Louis!: Plays the Music of Louis Armstrong (Epic, 1964)
 Trumpets' Greatest Hits (Epic, 1965)
 A String of Pearls (Epic, 1965)
 Trumpet de Luxe with Billy Butterfield (CBS [Japan], 1966)
 Creole Cookin (Verve, 1967)
 That Midnight Touch (Project 3, 1967)
 A Time for Love (Project 3, 1967)
 Bobby/Billy/Brazil (Verve, 1968)
 This Is My Bag (Project 3, 1969)
 Live at the Roosevelt Grill (Chiaroscuro, 1970)
 The Bobby Hackett 4 (Hyannisport, 1972)
 Bobby Hackett and Vic Dickenson at the Royal Box (Hyannisport, 1972)
 What a Wonderful World (Flying Dutchman, 1973)
 Strike Up the Band (Flying Dutchman, 1975)
 Live in New Orleans (Riff, 1976)
 Featuring Vic Dickenson at the Roosevelt Grill (Chiaroscuro, 1977)
 Tin Roof Blues (Honey Dew, 1977)
 Butterfly Airs Vol. 1 (Honey Dew, 1977)
 Jazz Session (CBS, 1980)

As sideman
With Jackie Gleason
 Music for Lovers Only (Capitol, 1952)
 Music to Make You Misty (Capitol, 1953)
 Music, Martinis, and Memories (Capitol, 1954)
 Jackie Gleason Presents Autumn Leaves (Capitol, 1955)
 Music to Remember Her (Capitol, 1955)
 Music to Change Her Mind (Capitol, 1956)
 Jackie Gleason Presents Music for the Love Hours (Capitol, 1957)
 Jackie Gleason Presents Lush Musical Interludes for That Moment (Capitol, 1959)
 The Most Beautiful Girl in the World (Pickwick/33, 1967)

With others  ( Frankie Laine 1955 'Te Amo')
 Louis Armstrong, Town Hall (RCA Victor, 1957)
 Tony Bennett, The Very Thought of You (Columbia, 1965)
 Tony Bennett, A Time for Love (Columbia, 1966)
 Teresa Brewer, Good News (Signature, 1974)
 Ruth Brown, Ruth Brown (Atlantic, 1957)
 Jim Cullum Jr., Goose Pimples (Audiophile, 1967)
 Eddie Condon, Bixieland (credited as Pete Pesci, Columbia, 1955)
 Eddie Condon, Midnight in Moscow (Epic, 1962)
 Eddie Condon, Eddie Condon On Stage (Saga, 1973)
 Dizzy Gillespie, Giants (Perception, 1971)
 Benny Goodman, The Famous 1938 Carnegie Hall Jazz Concert (Columbia, 1950)
 Bill Kenny, I Don't Stand a Ghost of a Chance with You (Decca, 1951)
 Glenn Miller, A String of Pearls (Bluebird, 1941)
 Glenn Miller, Rhapsody in Blue (Victor, 1942)
 Frank Sinatra, I've Got a Crush on You (Columbia, 1947)
 Frank Sinatra, Body and Soul (Columbia, 1947)
 Jack Teagarden, Jack Teagarden!!! (Verve, 1962)
 Lee Wiley, Night in Manhattan (Columbia, 1955)

References

External links
 Bobby Hackett recordings at the Discography of American Historical Recordings.

Further reading
 Hulme, George and Whyatt, Bert.  Bobby Hackett: His Life in Music, Hardinge Simpole, 2015. . 2016

Dixieland jazz musicians
American trumpeters
American male trumpeters
Easy listening musicians
Musicians from Providence, Rhode Island
1915 births
1976 deaths
20th-century American musicians
20th-century trumpeters
20th-century American male musicians
American male jazz musicians
Glenn Miller Orchestra members
Capitol Records artists
Columbia Records artists
Epic Records artists
Verve Records artists